Thundershorts is a short-form comedy website founded in June 2014. It features comedians such as Michael Showalter, Jim Gaffigan, Michael Che, Janeane Garofalo, Kumail Nanjiani, David Wain and Ted Alexandro.

References

External links

American comedy websites
Internet properties established in 2014